A Man Named Rocca is a 1961 French-Italian crime-thriller film directed by Jean Becker and starring Jean Paul Belmondo. It is based on the 1958 novel L'Excommunié by José Giovanni. Belmondo appeared in another film version of this novel in 1972, directed by Giovanni, called Bad Luck.

Plot
Roberto La Rocca is an ex-gangster who is told by "The Mexican" that his friend Xavier Adé has been imprisoned for a murder he did not commit. He goes to Marseilles to meet Adé's partner Villanova.

Rocca suspect that Villanova is involved in the frame up and seduces his mistress Maud. He shoots and kills Villanova and takes over the gambling club run by Xavier and Villanova.

Rocca falls in love with Adé's sister, Genevieve. Xavier is found guilty and sentenced to ten years in prison. When gangsters threaten the club, Rocca shoots them and is sentenced to prison too.

In prison, Rocca and Xavier volunteer to clear land mines. Xavier loses an arm because of this. When they get out, Rocca and Genevieve plan to buy a farm together. However, Genevieve is killed in a shoot out caused by Xavier. The friendship between Rocca and Xavier is over.

Cast 
 Jean-Paul Belmondo as  Roberto La Rocca 
 Christine Kaufmann  as  Geneviève Adé 
 Pierre Vaneck as  Xavier Adé  
 Béatrice Altariba as  Maud 
 Henri Virlogeux  as  Ficelle  
  Pedro Serano as Migli  
 Mario David  as  Charlot l'élégant  
  Charles Moulin as Cipriano 
 Jean-Pierre Darras  as  Nevada 
 Claude Piéplu  as  le directeur de la prison
 Michel Constantin  as  le chef des racketteurs américains 
  Frédéric Lambre as  Fanfan
  Claude Jaeger as  Fernand l'Italien
 Gérard Hernandez as  un détenu démineur
  Henri Arius as le chef responsable du cachot de la prison
 Edmond Beauchamp  as l'avocat de Xavier  
 Jacques Léonard  as le joueur qui refuse de partir 
 Dominique Zardi  as  le prisonnier sautant sur une mine
 Leroy Haynes
 Nico as sunbathing model

References

External links

A Man Named Rocca at Le Film Guide

Films based on works by José Giovanni
Films directed by Jean Becker
French crime thriller films
1961 films
Films with screenplays by José Giovanni
1961 directorial debut films
1960s French films
Italian crime thriller films
1960s Italian films